Johannes was the second Archbishop of Uppsala, Sweden, with a short-lived reign between 1185 and 1187.

Biography
His name is sometimes spelled as 'Johan', the Swedish form of 'Johannes', but since the Swedish language had yet to be established it is of little importance. Little is known about Johannes. Only a few months after the death of the first Archbishop Stefan, Johannes was selected by the Pope to be his successor. He was ordained by the Archbishop of Lund, Absalon—the primate over the newly established Swedish archbishopric—by November 1185.

Johennes was killed during pillage of Sigtuna in 1187 by pagan raiders (Estonians, Curonians, or Karelians).<ref name=Tarvel>Enn Tarvel (2007). [http://haridus.opleht.ee/Arhiiv/7_82007/38-41.pdf Sigtuna hukkumine.]  Haridus, 2007 (7-8), p 38–41</ref>

In 1187, a ship from the not yet christianed Estonia entered Mälaren, a lake close to Uppsala, on a plundering expedition. It sailed to Sigtuna, a prosperous city at that time, and plundered it. On its way back, barricades had been set up at Almarestäket, the only exit point and the place where Johannes was currently residing, to prevent the ship from escaping. The ship was however able to get around the barricades through a creek. There followed a battle, and during the battle Johannes was killed.

 Ext. links 
Raid on Sigtuna

 References 

 Svea Rikes Ärkebiskopar'', Uppsala, 1935

Roman Catholic archbishops of Uppsala
12th-century Roman Catholic archbishops in Sweden
Military personnel killed in action